The Midwest Curling Association (MCA) is a regional association of the United States Curling Association with member clubs in Illinois, Iowa, and Missouri. The MCA organizes communication and competition between the nine member clubs as well as facilitating communication with the national association.

History 
When originally founded in 1945, the organization represented more than 40 clubs from Nebraska, Ohio, Minnesota, Wisconsin, Illinois, Michigan, and North Dakota. The Midwest Curling Association was dissolved on May 23, 1964, and Illinois was advised to create their own organization, so the Illinois Curling Association was founded. In 2014, the Illinois Curling Association began to support clubs outside the state which lead to the board deciding in 2018 to revert to the name Midwest Curling Association.

Member clubs

References

External links 

Midwest Curling Association
 United States Curling Association

Curling in the United States
Curling governing bodies in the United States
Sports in Illinois
Curling in Illinois
1964 establishments in Illinois
1945 establishments in the United States